Steven Rooks (born 7 August 1960) is a former Dutch professional road racing cyclist known for his climbing ability. His professional career ran from 1982–1995.

Career
In the 1988 Tour de France, Rooks finished second and won a finish on L’Alpe d’Huez. He won the polka dot jersey for the mountains classification and the Présence Classification (or combination classification). In the 1989 Tour, Rooks won Stage 15, a 39 km mountain top time trial to Orcières-Merlette; he finished seventh that year and again won the Présence Classification, the final year of that award.

Other victories include the 1983 Liège–Bastogne–Liège, the 1986 Tour de Luxembourg and Amstel Gold Race, a stage at the 1987 Tour de Suisse, the 1988 Züri-Metzgete, and 1994 national championship.  He finished second at the 1991 World Cycling Championships behind Italy's Gianni Bugno and ahead of Spain's Miguel Indurain.

Doping confession
On the Dutch TV-show Reporter, Rooks admitted with Maarten Ducrot and Peter Winnen to doping.  Rooks said he used testosterone and amphetamines during his 13-year career. In 2009, he admitted using EPO after 1989.

Major results
Source:

1982
 8th Overall Deutschland Tour
 10th Overall Volta a Catalunya
1983
 1st Liège–Bastogne–Liège
 3rd Overall Paris–Nice
 3rd Overall Tour Méditerranéen 
1st Stage 2b
 8th Rund um den Henninger Turm
 8th Grand Prix de Monaco
 10th Amstel Gold Race
1984
 1st Stage 7 (TTT) Ronde van Nederland
 2nd Paris–Tours
 4th Liège–Bastogne–Liège
 5th Rund um den Henninger Turm
 5th Grand Prix Impanis
 6th Road race, National Road Championships
 6th Overall Tour de Romandie
 9th Overall Paris–Nice
1st Stage 2b (TTT)
 10th Overall Tour Méditerranéen
1985
 1st Stage 4b Volta a Catalunya
 1st Stage 4 Tour of Norway
 1st Stage 5b (TTT) Ronde van Nederland
 2nd Overall Critérium du Dauphiné Libéré
1st Stage 7 
 3rd Overall Étoile de Bessèges
 6th Binche-Tournai-Binche
 8th Paris–Brussels
 10th Liège–Bastogne–Liège
1986
 1st  Overall Tour de Luxembourg
 1st  Overall Vuelta a Andalucía
1st Prologue
 1st Amstel Gold Race
 1st Grand Prix de Wallonie
 5th Overall Tirreno–Adriatico
 5th Liège–Bastogne–Liège
 7th La Flèche Wallonne
 7th Paris–Brussels
 9th Overall Tour de France
 9th Overall Setmana Catalana de Ciclisme
1987
 1st Stage 2 Tour de Suisse
 2nd Overall Tour of Britain
 2nd Amstel Gold Race
 2nd Omloop Het Volk
 6th Road race, UCI Road World Championships
 6th Tour of Flanders
 9th Overall Tour de Luxembourg
 9th Overall Vuelta a Andalucía
1988
 1st Züri-Metzgete
 2nd Overall Tour de France
1st  Mountains classification
1st  Combination classification
1st Stage 12
 2nd Amstel Gold Race
 3rd Milan–San Remo
 3rd La Flèche Wallonne
 3rd Clásica de San Sebastián
 4th Liège–Bastogne–Liège
 5th Tour of Flanders
1989
 1st  Overall Tour du Vaucluse
 2nd La Flèche Wallonne
 4th Road race, UCI Road World Championships
 5th Tre Valli Varesine
 6th Liège–Bastogne–Liège
 6th Baden-Baden (with Gert-Jan Theunisse)
 7th Overall Tour de France
1st  Combination classification
1st Stage 15
 7th Rund um den Henninger Turm
1990
 1st Stage 2 (TTT) Tour de France
 2nd Road race, National Road Championships
 2nd Overall Settimana Internazionale di Coppi e Bartali
 3rd Liège–Bastogne–Liège
 4th Overall Ronde van Nederland
 5th La Flèche Wallonne
1991
 1st  Road race, National Road Championships
 2nd  Road race, UCI Road World Championships
 2nd Overall Volta a la Comunitat Valenciana
 6th Wincanton Classic
 9th Overall Vuelta a España
1992
 2nd Liège–Bastogne–Liège
 5th Road race, UCI Road World Championships
 5th Overall Tour of Galicia
1st Stage 4 
 7th Wincanton Classic
 8th La Flèche Wallonne
 10th Overall Vuelta a España
 10th Overall Tour of the Basque Country
1993
 2nd Road race, National Road Championships
 4th Brabantse Pijl
 9th Veenendaal–Veenendaal
 10th Liège–Bastogne–Liège
1994
 1st  Road race, National Road Championships
 6th Amstel Gold Race
1995 
 8th Amstel Gold Race

Grand Tour general classification results timeline

Honors 
 In 1988, Rooks was Dutch Sportsman of the year.
 Since 2004, Maastricht, the Steven Rooks Classic, an amateur race, is organised in his honor.

See also
 List of doping cases in cycling
 Jean de Gribaldy

References

External links
Sportsmarketing, the Company of Steven Rooks
The Steven Rooks Classic
Official Tour de France results for Steven Rooks

1960 births
Living people
People from Schermer
Dutch male cyclists
Dutch Tour de France stage winners
Dutch sportspeople in doping cases
Doping cases in cycling
Tour de Suisse stage winners
UCI Road World Championships cyclists for the Netherlands
Sportspeople from Alkmaar
Cyclists from North Holland
20th-century Dutch people
21st-century Dutch people